Lincoln Stedman (May 18, 1907 – March 22, 1948) was an American silent film actor.

Biography
Stedman was born in Denver, Colorado, the only child to Marshall Stedman and silent film beauty Myrtle Stedman. Stedman had a career in films dating back to his boyhood in silent films with his parents. He appeared in more than 80 films between 1917 and 1934. Overweight as a teenager, Stedman resembled Roscoe Arbuckle which allowed him to convincingly play adult roles far beyond his years in real life.

He was married to Carol Rohe Stedman. One month before his death of a heart-ailment, his daughter Loretta Myrtle Stedman was born. Lincoln Stedman died in Los Angeles, California and was buried at the Holy Cross Cemetery in Los Angeles.

Partial filmography
 

 The Charmer (1917)
 The Atom (1918)
 The Winning Girl (1919)
 Puppy Love (1919)
 Out of the Storm (1920)
 The Charm School (1921)
 Two Minutes to Go (1921)
 My Lady Friends (1921)
 The Old Swimmin' Hole (1921)
 Under the Lash (1921)
 Be My Wife (1921)
 A Homespun Vamp (1922)
 One Terrible Day (1922)
 The Freshie (1922)
 White Shoulders (1922)
 The Big Show (1923)
 The Dangerous Age (1923)
 The Prisoner (1923)
 A Pleasant Journey (1923)
 Soul of the Beast (1923)
 The Scarlet Lily (1923)
 Lodge Night (1923)
 No Noise (1923)
 The Wanters (1923)
 The Meanest Man in the World (1923)
 The Man Life Passed By (1923)
 Black Oxen (1923)
 Captain January (1924)
 The Wife of the Centaur (1924)
 On Probation (1924)
 Red Hot Tires (1925)
 Sealed Lips (1925)
 Made for Love (1926)
 One Minute to Play (1926)
 The Warning Signal (1926)
 Remember (1926 film)
 Dame Chance (1926)
 The Little Firebrand (1926)
 Let It Rain (1927)
 Rookies (1927)
 The Prince of Headwaiters (1927)
 Perch of the Devil (1927)
 The Devil's Cage (1928)
 Green Grass Widows (1928)
 The Farmer's Daughter (1928)
 Harold Teen (1928)
 Why Be Good? (1929)
 Tanned Legs (1929)
 The Woman Between (1931)
 Billboard Girl (1932)
 Sailor Be Good (1933)

References

External links

1907 births
1948 deaths
American male film actors
American male silent film actors
Male actors from Denver
20th-century American male actors